Eglinton Football Club are a Scottish football club based in Kilwinning in Ayrshire. Nicknamed the Jousters, the club were formed in 2021 and are based at Ian Cashmore Memorial Park. The club currently and play in red and white stripes with royal blue shorts.

Their ground is part of the Kilwinning Sports Centre complex, with their astroturf pitch a few yards away from Buffs Park, the home of Kilwinning Rangers.

They started in the Ayrshire amateur leagues in 2021, before making the step into the Scottish senior pyramid by joining the West of Scotland Football League the following year. They current play in the Fourth Division of the WoSFL (the tenth tier of the Scottish pyramid).

Coaching staff
Manager - William Shearer
Coach - Sammy Taggart
Coach - Davie Cormack
Coach - Stephen Forrest
Goalkeeping coach - Shaun Black
Performance Analyst - Stephen Sneddon

References

External links
 Website 

Football clubs in Scotland
Football in North Ayrshire
Association football clubs established in 2021
2021 establishments in Scotland
Kilwinning
West of Scotland Football League teams